Zhu Shilin (27 July 1899 – 5 January 1967), also romanised as Chu Shek Lin, was a Chinese film director, born in Taicang, Jiangsu, China. Zhu began his career in the thriving film industry of Shanghai, directing actresses like Ruan Lingyu with the Lianhua Film Company. After the war, Zhu moved to Hong Kong, where he founded the Longma Film Company along with fellow Shanghai emigrant Fei Mu.

Between 1930 and 1964, he directed 80 films. Two of his films, Sorrows of the Forbidden City (1948) and Festival Moon (1953) were ranked in the Hong Kong Film Awards' Best 100 Chinese Motion Pictures.

External links

Zhu Shilin at the Chinese Movie Database

1899 births
1967 deaths
Film directors from Jiangsu
Screenwriters from Jiangsu
Hong Kong film directors
Artists from Suzhou
Writers from Suzhou
Chinese silent film directors
20th-century screenwriters
Chinese emigrants to Hong Kong